Platyla is a genus of very small land snails with an operculum, terrestrial gastropod mollusks or micromollusks in the family Aciculidae.

Species
Species within the genus Platyla include:

 Platyla albanica Subai, 2012
 † Platyla alta (Clessin, 1911) 
 Platyla banatica (Rossmässler, 1842)
 † Platyla beatricis (Gaál, 1910) 
 † Platyla callosa (O. Boettger, 1870) 
 † Platyla callosiuscula (Andreae, 1904) 
 Platyla callostoma (Clessin, 1911)
 Platyla ceraunorum A. Reischütz, N. Steiner-Reischütz & P. L. Reischütz, 2016
 Platyla cryptomena (de Folin & Bérillon, 1877)
 Platyla curtii (A. J. Wagner, 1912)
 Platyla dupuyi (Paladilhe, 1868)
 Platyla elisabethae (L. Pintér & Szigethy, 1973)
 † Platyla eocaena (Oppenheim, 1895) 
 † Platyla falkneri Boeters, E. Gittenberger & Subai, 1989 
 Platyla feheri Subai, 2009
 Platyla foliniana (G. Nevill, 1879)
 Platyla gracilis (Clessin, 1877) 
 Platyla hedionda Torres Alba, 2012
 Platyla jankowskiana (Jackiewicz, 1979)
 Platyla jordai Altaba, 2013
 † Platyla klemmi (Schlickum & Strauch, 1972) 
 Platyla lusitanica (D. T. Holyoak & Seddon, 1985)
 Platyla maasseni Boeters, E. Gittenberger & Subai, 1989
 † Platyla manganellii Harzhauser, Neubauer & Esu in Harzhauser et al., 2015 
 Platyla merillaensis Quiñonero-Salgado, Ruiz Cobo & Rolán, 2017
 Platyla microspira (Pini, 1885)
 Platyla minutissima Boeters, E. Gittenberger & Subai, 1989
 Platyla orthostoma (Jackiewicz, 1979)
 Platyla peloponnesica Boeters, E. Gittenberger & Subai, 1989
 Platyla perpusilla (Reinhardt, 1880)
 Platyla pezzolii Boeters, E. Gittenberger & Subai, 1989
 Platyla pinteri (Subai, 1976)
 Platyla polita (W. Hartmann, 1840)
 Platyla procax Boeters, E. Gittenberger & Subai, 1989
 Platyla sardoa Cianfanelli, Talenti, Bodon & Manganelli, 2000
 Platyla stussineri (O. Boettger, 1884)
 Platyla subdiaphana (Bivona, 1839)
 † Platyla subfusca (Flach, 1889) 
 † Platyla subpolita (Gottschick, 1921) 
 Platyla talentii Bodon & Cianfanelli, 2008
 Platyla turcica Boeters, E. Gittenberger & Subai, 1989
 Platyla wilhelmi (A. J. Wagner, 1910)

References

External links
 Hesse P. (1917). Kritische Fragmente. XVIII. Nochmals Nomenklaturfragen. XVIII. Ein neues Subgenus von Acme. Nachrichtsblatt der Deutschen Malakozoologischen Gesellschaft. 49 (3): 122-124. Frankfurt am Main
 Boeters, H. D.; Gittenberger, E. & Subai, P. (1989). Die Aciculidae (Mollusca: Gastropoda Prosobranchia). Zoologische Verhandelingen. 252: 1-234. Leiden

 
Aciculidae
Taxonomy articles created by Polbot